Poplar Level is a neighborhood five miles (8 km) southeast of downtown Louisville, Kentucky, United States. It is part of the larger Camp Zachary Taylor area.

Named for the poplar wood planks that originally made up Poplar Level Road, the main roadway through the neighborhood as it stretched from Germantown to  Petersburg, it is bounded by Eastern Parkway to the north, Poplar Level road to the west, Newburg Road to the east, and Interstate 264 to the south. The South Fork of Beargrass Creek runs through the neighborhood.

Neighborhood characteristics
With many parklands, such as Joe Creason Park, two large cemeteries, Louisville Cemetery and Calvary Cemetery, the Beargrass Creek State Nature Preserve and the Louisville Zoo, less than 20% of land in Poplar Level contains residential development.

While many of the southern portions of Poplar Level were developed as part of Camp Zachary Taylor in 1917, most modern residential development occurred in the 1950s, while most modern commercial development, such as area Kmart and Kroger stores, occurred in the 1960s.

A resurgence of commercial development began in 2006, with the development of the Villages of Audubon, the first major commercial development in Poplar Level in over 20 years. Adjacent to Norton Audubon Hospital, it is planned to have  of retail space that will include a Chili's Grill & Bar, Panera Bread, Starbucks, and soon to be a new Norton Healthcare facility.

Attractions and landmarks

Bellarmine University
Calvary Cemetery, a Catholic Cemetery opened in 1921.
Joe Creason Park, named after Joe Creason; acquired by the City of Louisville in the 1960s from the estate of Ben Collins.
Louisville Cemetery, located at the intersection of Poplar Level and Eastern Parkway, The Louisville Cemetery was opened by 1886 in a then-rural setting and has traditionally buried only African Americans.
Beargrass Creek State Nature Preserve
Louisville Zoo
Norton Audubon Hospital, opened originally as St. Joseph's Infirmary in 1832.
Our Lady of Peace, founded by the Sisters of Charity of Nazareth in 1951, is now one of the largest private psychiatric hospitals in America. Owned by Jewish Hospital & St. Mary's Healthcare.
 St. Xavier High School

Demographics
As of the 2000 census, it is estimated that there were 1,780 people and 681 households residing in the Poplar Level neighborhood. The racial makeup is 96.30% White, 2.20% Black or African American, and 0.9% listed as some other race. Hispanics or Latinos of any race make up 0.06% of the population.

College graduates are estimated to be 39.9% of the population, while people without a high school degree are estimated at 13.4%. Females outnumber males 54.6% to 45.4%.

References

External links

Area parks and attractions
Allgeier Community Center
Beargrass Creek State Nature Preserve
Camp Taylor Memorial Park
George Rogers Clark Park
Joe Creason Park
Louisville Nature Center
Louisville Tennis Center
Louisville Zoo
Nightingale Park

Groups and clubs
Camp Zachary Taylor Neighborhood Association
German-American Club of Louisville

Neighborhood map
Street Map: Poplar Level
   Images of Poplar Level (Louisville, Ky.) in the University of Louisville Libraries Digital Collection

Neighborhoods in Louisville, Kentucky